James Aiton Hunter, also known as James Semple (5 July 1898 – 1982) was a Scottish footballer who played as a left back.

His first senior club at the end of World War I was Newcastle United, but before playing a first-team match he then signed for Motherwell while still registered as a Newcastle player; however it was decided that the transfer was acceptable with no fee due. Hunter soon moved on to Falkirk at the end of 1919, spending the next four years with the Bairns and being selected twice for the Scottish Football League XI in 1923.

In January 1924 he returned to Newcastle for a free of £3,500 with the club anticipating the need to replace defender Frank Hudspeth who was then 33, but the veteran played on for several more years. Hunter served as back-up until 1925, with a high asking price deterring clubs in Britain; instead he moved away to play in the American Soccer League with New Bedford Whalers, where he played until 1930.

References

1898 births
1982 deaths
Footballers from Stirling (council area)
Scottish footballers
Association football defenders
English Football League players
Motherwell F.C. players
Newcastle United F.C. players
Falkirk F.C. players
New Bedford Whalers players
Scottish Football League players
Scottish Football League representative players
American Soccer League (1921–1933) players
Scottish expatriate sportspeople in the United States
Expatriate soccer players in the United States
Scottish expatriate footballers